The Church of St. Martin in Landshut is a medieval church in Bavaria. St. Martin's Church, along with Trausnitz Castle and the celebration of the Landshuter Hochzeit (wedding), are the most important landmarks and historical events of Landshut. The Brick Gothic building features Bavaria's tallest church tower, and this steeple is also the 2nd tallest brick structure in the world (after Anaconda Smelter Stack) made without steel supports.

History
In the year 1204, the town of Landshut was founded by Duke Louis I, Duke of Bavaria the Kelheimer. He established Castle Trausnitz and built a small church on the site of the present-day St. Martin's Church.  That structure was superseded by building the existing church, which began in 1389.
It took about 110 years to finish the church. During this period, five architects managed the building site. It took 55 years just to build the tower. The church was finally dedicated in 1500.

Features
The choir elbow cross of 1495 has an overall length of 8 m (22 feet). The crucifix is one of the largest of the late Gothic period. The body was carved from a lime tree trunk and has a length of 5.80 m (16 feet) and an arm width of 5.40 m (15 feet). Sculpted by Michel Erhart, it was installed in 1495.

Other important works of art in the church include the high altar, the hexagonal pulpit carved from a single stone, and the "rose wreath/ring Madonna" (about 1520), created by Hans Leinberger and considered one of his most important works of art.

Construction and renovations
Construction of the church began around 1389, under the architect Hans von Burghausen. The exact date for the beginning of construction of the church is not well known, but its construction was first noted in the city chronicle in 1392. The building was completed in 1500.

The church was built from brick and mortar. Five thousand wooden stakes were used for the foundation.  The stakes are located completely in the groundwater, in order to delay rot caused by bacteria.

With a height of 130.6 m (428 feet), the church tower is considered to be the tallest brick building in the world, surpassing the Church of Our Lady, Bruges, in Belgium by 8.6 meters.  In the year 2001, St. Martin's Church received the title of basilica minor from the Pope.

The church is built in Gothic style, demonstrated by the pointed shape of its windows and arches.

Gallery

See also
 List of tallest structures built before the 20th century

References and notes

External links

SkyscraperPage - St. Martin's Church
 

Basilica churches in Germany
Roman Catholic churches in Bavaria
Landshut, St. Martin
Buildings and structures in Landshut